North Island is a provincial electoral district for the Legislative Assembly of British Columbia, Canada.

Demographics

Member of Legislative Assembly 

Its MLA is Michele Babchuk. She was first elected in 2020 and represents the British Columbia New Democratic Party.

Election results

References

External links 
BC Stats Profile - 2001 (pdf)
Results of 2001 election (pdf)
2001 Expenditures (pdf)
Results of 1996 election
1996 Expenditures (pdf)
Results of 1991 election
1991 Expenditures
Website of the Legislative Assembly of British Columbia

British Columbia provincial electoral districts on Vancouver Island
Campbell River, British Columbia